The Rigid Raider (RRC) is a series of fast raiding and assault craft made by RTK Marine, a subsidiary of Halmatic, part of BAE Systems Surface Ships. They are primarily in service with two branches of the British Armed Forces: The Royal Navy (incl. the Royal Marines and the Special Boat Service) and the British Army. Despite being among the smallest of the amphibious craft, the RRC is one of the most widely used due to its mobility and versatility. As such, the Rigid Raider often finds itself deployed in amphibious and riverine operations around the globe, in environments ranging from the Arctic to the tropics.

Specifications
The Rigid Raider Mk3 has the following specifications:
Hull: Glass-reinforced plastic
Weight (full): 2,500 kg (2.5 tonnes)
Length: 
Width : 
Speed (full): 
Range: In excess of 
Troops: 10 Royal Marines (2 crew, 8 fully equipped troops)

There is also a larger 8 meter version of the RRC in service with the Royal Navy and Royal Marines.

See also
List of active Royal Marines military watercraft

References

External links
Royal Marines - Landing Craft (royalnavy.mod.uk)

Amphibious warfare vessels of the United Kingdom
Landing craft
British Army equipment
Royal Marines
Military boats